Matti Lähde (May 14, 1911, Joutseno – May 2, 1978) was a Finnish cross-country skier who competed in the 1930s. He won a gold medal at the 1936 Winter Olympics in Garmisch-Partenkirchen in the 4 × 10 km relay.

Cross-country skiing results

Olympic Games
 1 medal – (1 gold)

World Championships

References

Finland's first Olympic Champions

1911 births
1978 deaths
People from Lappeenranta
People from Viipuri Province (Grand Duchy of Finland)
Finnish male cross-country skiers
Olympic cross-country skiers of Finland
Olympic gold medalists for Finland
Olympic medalists in cross-country skiing
Cross-country skiers at the 1936 Winter Olympics
Medalists at the 1936 Winter Olympics
Sportspeople from South Karelia
20th-century Finnish people